Corentin da Silva Martins (born 11 July 1969) is a French former professional footballer who played as an attacking midfielder, currently manager of the Libya national team.

Playing career

Club
Martins was born in Brest, Brittany, of Portuguese descent. He started his professional career with hometown club Stade Brestois 29, moving to AJ Auxerre in 1991 and being part of the emergent side led by legendary Guy Roux that in 1992–93 reached the UEFA Cup semi-finals and, four years later, achieved an historic double.

On 30 May 1996, Martins signed with Deportivo de La Coruña in Spain. After an impressive first season in La Liga, he lost his place in the squad due to injuries. He returned to France and its Ligue 1 in January 1998 by joining RC Strasbourg Alsace, captaining the side against Amiens SC in the 2001 final of the Coupe de France which was won on penalties.

After a loan spell at FC Girondins de Bordeaux, Martins returned to Strasbourg and remained there until 2004, finishing his career the same year after a few months with Clermont Foot.

International
Martins earned his first cap for France on 27 March 1993, in a 1–0 win against Austria. He represented the nation at UEFA Euro 1996 and made a total of 14 appearances, but his international career was eclipsed by the emergence of Zinedine Zidane.

Coaching career
Martins started his managerial career in 2006 with lowly Quimper Cornouaille FC. In the following year he was named his first club's director of football, but had a brief spell as interim coach at the beginning of the 2008–09 campaign. He subsequently stayed on as an assistant for the Ligue 2 team.

Martins returned twice more as caretaker manager for Brest: during 2011–12, after Alex Dupont was dismissed, and again the following top-flight season when Landry Chauvin was shown the door. He managed to avert relegation on the first occasion, but failed decisively on the second, when he lost all of his eight matches in charge and suffered relegation to the second tier as last.

On 8 October 2014, Martins was appointed manager of Mauritania. In January 2019, he extended his contract until 2021. 

Martins qualified the Lions of Chinguetti to the 2019 and 2021 Africa Cup of Nations, the former being a first-ever participation for the country. However, following a poor start to the 2022 FIFA World Cup qualification campaign, he was relieved of his duties.

On 11 April 2022, Martins replaced Javier Clemente at the helm of another African nation, Libya.

References

External links

1969 births
Living people
French people of Portuguese descent
Sportspeople from Brest, France
French footballers
Footballers from Brittany
Association football midfielders
Ligue 1 players
Ligue 2 players
Stade Brestois 29 players
AJ Auxerre players
RC Strasbourg Alsace players
FC Girondins de Bordeaux players
Clermont Foot players
La Liga players
Deportivo de La Coruña players
France international footballers
UEFA Euro 1996 players
Brittany international footballers
French expatriate footballers
Expatriate footballers in Spain
French expatriate sportspeople in Spain
French football managers
Ligue 1 managers
Stade Brestois 29 managers
Mauritania national football team managers
Libya national football team managers
2019 Africa Cup of Nations managers
French expatriate football managers
Expatriate football managers in Mauritania
Expatriate football managers in Libya
French expatriate sportspeople in Mauritania